The Mythimnini are a small tribe of moths in the Hadeninae subfamily. As numerous hadenine genera have not yet been assigned to a tribe, the genus list is preliminary.

Genera
Analetia
Anapoma
Leucania
Mythimna
Senta
Vietteania